During the 2006–07 German football season, 1. FC Kaiserslautern competed in the 2. Bundesliga.

Season summary
Kaiserslautern failed to challenge for an immediate return to the Bundesliga. Manager Wolfgang Wolf left the club in April; after a brief spell under caretaker Wolfgang Funkel, Kjetil Rekdal was appointed as permanent successor.

Players

First-team squad
Squad at end of season

Left club during season

Competitions

2. Bundesliga

League table

References

Notes

1. FC Kaiserslautern seasons
German football clubs 2006–07 season